Åsskard is a former municipality in Møre og Romsdal county, Norway. The  municipality existed from 1895 until its dissolution in 1965.  It was located in what is now the northern part of Surnadal Municipality. The former municipality of Åsskard (historically spelled Aasgaard) included the area around the Åsskardfjorden, north of the Hamnesfjorden, and east of the Trongfjorden. The administrative centre was the village of Åsskard where the Åsskard Church is located.

History
The municipality of Aasgaard was established on 1 May 1895 when it was separated from the large Stangvik Municipality. It had an initial population of 629. On 1 July 1915, a southern district of Halsa Municipality (population: 114) was transferred to Aasgaard.  The spelling was later changed to Åsskard. During the 1960s, there were many municipal mergers across Norway due to the work of the Schei Committee. On 1 January 1965, Åsskard Municipality (population: 1,014) was merged with most of Stangvik Municipality (population: 1,386) and Surnadal Municipality (population: 3,534) to form a new municipality called Surnadal.

Government
All municipalities in Norway, including Åsskard, are responsible for primary education (through 10th grade), outpatient health services, senior citizen services, unemployment and other social services, zoning, economic development, and municipal roads.  The municipality is governed by a municipal council of elected representatives, which in turn elects a mayor.

Municipal council
The municipal council  of Åsskard was made up of 13 representatives that were elected to four year terms.  The party breakdown of the final municipal council was as follows:

See also
List of former municipalities of Norway

References

Surnadal
Former municipalities of Norway
1895 establishments in Norway
1965 disestablishments in Norway